Aminobacter anthyllidis is a bacterium from the genus of Aminobacter.

References

Phyllobacteriaceae
Bacteria described in 2013